Sincheon-daero() is road name in South Korea.
 Sincheon-daero (Daegu)
 Sincheon-daero (Busan)